Isaiah Terrell Wilson (born February 12, 1999) is a former American football offensive tackle who played one season with the Tennessee Titans of the National Football League (NFL). He played college football at Georgia and was drafted by the Titans in the first round of the 2020 NFL Draft. Since dropping out of the NFL, he has pursued a career as a rapper.

Wilson's tenure with the Titans was characterized by violations of team rules and several off-field legal issues, leading to minimal playing time and his subsequent trade to the Miami Dolphins after his rookie season. He was released by the Dolphins three days later after he refused the team's efforts to help him. He signed with the New York Giants' practice squad during the 2021 season.

Early life
Wilson attended Poly Prep in Brooklyn, New York. He played in the 2017 Under Armour All-America Game. Wilson was a consensus five-star recruit. He was the 16th highest-rated player and the fifth highest-rated offensive tackle in the class of 2017. He committed to play college football for the University of Georgia on December 16, 2016.

College career
Wilson redshirted his first year at Georgia in 2017. He became a starter in 2018 and started in all but one game in the 2018 and 2019 seasons. Wilson was named to the second-team All-SEC in 2019. He entered the 2020 NFL Draft, forgoing two years of college eligibility.

Professional career

Tennessee Titans
Wilson became the 29th overall draft pick in the first round of the 2020 NFL Draft when he was chosen by the Tennessee Titans. He was expected to compete with veteran Dennis Kelly for the open starting right tackle position. Wilson was placed on the reserve/COVID-19 list by the team at the start of training camp on July 28, 2020 before returning to the active roster when he signed a four-year rookie contract on August 3, 2020. He was placed back on the reserve/COVID-19 list on September 6, 2020. Wilson was activated from the reserve/COVID list on October 10, 2020. On December 5, 2020, Wilson was suspended for the Titans' Week 13 game against the Cleveland Browns due to a violation of team rules. He was reinstated from suspension on December 7, 2020 but was placed on the reserve/non-football illness list on December 9, 2020. He finished the season playing in one game, appearing for one snap in the third quarter of the Titans' Week 12, 45–26 win against the Indianapolis Colts.

On February 22, 2021, Wilson posted and then deleted a tweet saying he would no longer play football as a Titan.

Miami Dolphins
On March 17, 2021, Wilson and a seventh-round pick in the 2022 draft were traded to the Miami Dolphins in exchange for a seventh-round pick in the 2021 draft. He was waived by the Dolphins three days later after showing up late for his team physical and missing two workouts.

New York Giants
On September 29, 2021, Wilson signed with the New York Giants practice squad. On January 4, 2022, Wilson was released.

Legal issues
On September 11, 2020, Wilson was arrested for DUI. On January 7, 2021, Wilson was arrested for leading police on a 140-mile-per-hour chase. Police found 3.4 grams of marijuana in his car. On March 24, 2021, Wilson was charged with felony fleeing or attempting to elude a police officer, speeding in a construction zone, reckless driving, reckless conduct, possession of less than 1 ounce of marijuana and possession and use of drug-related objects.

Music career
In April 2021, under the stage name GGBowzer, Wilson released a hip hop EP titled Layup Lines.

References

External links

Georgia Bulldogs bio

1999 births
Living people
Sportspeople from Brooklyn
Players of American football from New York City
Players of American football from New York (state)
American football offensive tackles
Georgia Bulldogs football players
Tennessee Titans players
Miami Dolphins players
New York Giants players